Ollie Ernest West (December 28, 1913 – December 10, 1987), nicknamed "Bill", was an American Negro league pitcher in the 1940s.

A native of Silsbee, Texas, West made his Negro leagues debut in 1942 for the Chicago American Giants. He played with Chicago through 1945, and also briefly pitched for the Homestead Grays during their 1943 Negro World Series championship season. West died in Denver, Colorado in 1987 at age 73.

References

External links
 and Seamheads

1913 births
1987 deaths
Chicago American Giants players
Homestead Grays players
20th-century African-American sportspeople
Baseball pitchers